The 1981–82 Thorn EMI Rugby Union County Championship was the 82nd edition of England's County Championship rugby union club competition.

Lancashire won their 12th title after defeating North Midlands in the final. The final proved to be Lancashire and England captain Bill Beaumont's last rugby match. Beaumont left the field with concussion following a head injury during the first half and was subsequently advised to retire from playing immediately to avoid the risk of further injury causing permanent damage.

Second Round

Semi finals

Final

See also
 English rugby union system
 Rugby union in England

References

Rugby Union County Championship
County Championship (rugby union) seasons